Stephen Edward Baker (born August 30, 1964) is a former professional American football player who played wide receiver for six seasons with the New York Giants of the National Football League (NFL).

High school career
Baker attended Alexander Hamilton High School in Los Angeles, California, where he lettered in football, track, and gymnastics.

College career
Baker attended college at Fresno State University, where he caught 62 passes for 1,629 yards in two seasons.

Professional career
Drafted by the New York Giants in the third round (83rd overall) of the 1987 NFL Draft, Baker played for the Giants his entire career from 1987 to 1992.  Also known as Stephen Baker "The Touchdown Maker," he won a championship ring with New York in Super Bowl XXV, when they defeated the Buffalo Bills 20-19.  Baker caught two passes for 31 yards, including a 14-yard touchdown pass from Jeff Hostetler late in the 2nd quarter.

Baker finished his six NFL seasons with 141 receptions for 2,587 yards and 21 touchdowns, along with 21 rushing yards.

In 1992, according to Football Outsiders, Baker had the worst catch rate of any wide receiver from 1991–2011, catching only 28.8% of the passes thrown to him.

In 2008, Baker was inducted into the Fresno County Athletic Hall of Fame.

References

1964 births
Living people
American football wide receivers
Fresno State Bulldogs football players
New York Giants players
Players of American football from San Antonio